Close to the Bone may refer to:

 Close to the Bone (Thompson Twins album), 1987
 Close to the Bone (Tom Tom Club album), 1983
 Close to the Bone (novel), a 2013 Logan McRae novel by Stuart MacBride

See also 
 Closer to the Bone, a 2009 album by Kris Kristofferson